The Federal University of Grande Dourados (UFGD) is a Brazilian public institution which is located in the city of Dourados, state of Mato Grosso do Sul, Brazil.

External links

  

Grande Dourados
Universities and colleges in Mato Grosso do Sul
Educational institutions established in 2005
2005 establishments in Brazil